Hugh de Mortimer (c. 1100 – 26 February 1180/81) was a Norman English medieval lord.

Lineage 
The son of Ranulph de Mortimer, he was Lord of Wigmore Castle, Stratfield Mortimer, Cleobury Mortimer and at times, Bridgnorth, Bishop's Castle and Maelienydd.

Anarchy 
During the Anarchy of King Stephen's reign, Mortimer was an ardent royalist until at least 1148.  This was because Wigmore Castle had been confiscated from his father by King Henry I.  He only seems to have returned to England from his Norman estates in 1137.

Private Wars 
He did quarrel violently with his neighbouring Lords, most notably with Miles, earl of Hereford, his son Roger and Josce de Dinan, lord of Ludlow. The latter ambushed Mortimer and only released him after the payment of a substantial ransom. During this time Mortimer also took over the Royal castle at Bridgnorth.

Opposition to King Henry II 
Hugh was one of the Barons who objected to Henry II's demand for the return of Royal castles in 1155.  Henry II launched a campaign in May 1155 against Hugh, simultaneously besieging his three principal castles of Wigmore, Bridgnorth and Cleobury.  On 7 July 1155, Hugh formally submitted to Henry II at the Council at Bridgnorth. He was allowed to keep his own two castles (though Cleobury had been destroyed during the siege) but Bridgnorth returned to the crown.

Marriage and children 
Between 1148 and 1155 Hugh married Maud le Meschin (also known as Maud/Matilde du Bessin), daughter of William Meschin, Lord of Skipton, Yorkshire, and Cecily de Rumilly. Maud (Matilda) was the widow of Philip Belmeis of Tong.  Hugh and Maud's son Roger Mortimer of Wigmore succeeded his father as Lord of Wigmore.  Hugh and Maud had three other sons, Hugh (killed in a tournament), Ralph, and William.  Hugh may have died 26 Feb 1180/81 in Cleobury Mortimer, Shropshire, England, and was buried at Wigmore.

Notes

Sources

Remfry., P.M., Wigmore Castle, 1066 to 1181
Weis, Frederick Lewis Ancestral Roots of Certain American Colonist Who Came To America Before 1700 (7th ed.), line 136-24
Davies, Norman, The Isles: A History
Barber, Richard, Henry Plantagenet

Anglo-Normans
Norman warriors
Hugh
Lords of Wigmore
12th-century births
1180s deaths
Year of birth uncertain

Year of death uncertain